Criminal Law (Criminal Organisations Disruption) Amendment Act 2013, an act of the Parliament of Queensland, aims to combat "illegal activities of criminal gangs, including criminal [motorcycle] gangs," that is, significant types of organised crime in Queensland. The act was passed on 16 October 2013, and as of 17 October 2013, the Attorney-General of Queensland had indicated that the law had received Royal Assent and was in force. In 2016 it was repealed as part of the introduction of the Serious and Organised Crime Amendment Bill .

Acts amended

The title Act amends the following prior legislation:
 the Bail Act 1980;
 the Crime and Misconduct Act 2001;
 the Criminal Code of Queensland;
 the Penalties and Sentences Act 1992;
 the Police Powers and Responsibilities Act 2000; and 
 the Tow Truck Act 1973.

Prescribed criminal organizations and places

The Act declares the following organisations to be criminal organisations:

 Bandidos
 Black Uhlans
 Coffin Cheaters
 Comancheros
 Finks
 Fourth Reich
 Gladiators
 Gypsy Jokers
 Hells Angels
 Highway 61
 Iron Horsemen
 Life and Death
 Lone Wolf
 Milky Boys
 Mobshitters
 Mongols
 Muslim Brotherhood Movement
 Nomads
 Notorious
 Odins Warriors
 Outcasts
 Outlaws
 Phoenix
 Rebels
 Red Devils
 Renegades
 Scorpions

The Act declares 41 places to be "prescribed places."  They are:

 Albion, 
 Beenleigh, 
 Boyne Island, 
 Bungalow (2 places), 
 Burleigh Heads (2 places), 
 Caboolture, 
 Cairns, 
 Caloundra West, 
 Cannonvale, 
 Carrara, 
 Coopers Plains, 
 Currumbin Waters, 
 Emerald, 
 Eumundi, 
 Gladstone, 
 Hillcrest, 
 Kingaroy, 
 Kunda Park, 
 Mackay (2 places), 
 Mermaid Beach, 
 Moorooka (2 places), 
 Mt Isa, 
 Nerang, 
 Noosaville, 
 Queenton, 
 Racecourse, 
 Raceview, 
 Rockhampton, 
 Slacks Creek, 
 Tingalpa, 
 Toowoomba (2 places), 
 Townsville, 
 Virginia, 
 West End (2 places), and 
 Yeppoon.

See also

 Vicious Lawless Association Disestablishment Act 2013
 Tattoo Parlours Act 2013
 List of outlaw motorcycle clubs
 Gangs in Australia

Further reading
 Criminal Law (Criminal Organisations Disruption) Amendment Act 2013 PDF.

References 

Queensland legislation
2013 in Australian law
2010s in Queensland
Organised crime in Australia
Acts related to organized crime